Robert Edward Jenrick (born 9 January 1982) is a British politician serving as Minister of State for Immigration since October 2022. He served as Minister of State for Health from September to October 2022. He served as Secretary of State for Housing, Communities and Local Government from 2019 to 2021. A member of the Conservative Party, he has been Member of Parliament (MP) for Newark since 2014.

Born in Wolverhampton, Jenrick attended St John's College, Cambridge, where he read history, followed by the University of Pennsylvania. He then studied law and qualified as a solicitor. He was elected for Newark in a 2014 by-election following the resignation of Conservative MP Patrick Mercer after a cash for lobbying scandal.

From 2015 to 2018, Jenrick was Parliamentary Private Secretary to Employment Minister Esther McVey, Justice Secretaries Michael Gove and Liz Truss, and Home Secretary Amber Rudd. He served as Exchequer Secretary to the Treasury under Chancellor of the Exchequer Philip Hammond from 2018 to 2019. Jenrick was appointed Secretary of State for Housing, Communities and Local Government by Boris Johnson in July 2019, a position he held until September 2021. He returned to Government under Liz Truss in 2022 as Minister of State for Health.

Early life
Jenrick was born in Wolverhampton in 1982. He grew up in Shropshire near the town of Ludlow, as well as in Herefordshire.

Jenrick attended Wolverhampton Grammar School before reading history at St John's College, Cambridge, graduating in 2003. He was news editor at student newspaper Varsity in 2001. He was Thouron Fellow in Political Science at the University of Pennsylvania from 2003 to 2004. He subsequently studied law, gaining a graduate diploma in law from The College of Law in 2005 and completing a legal practice course at BPP Law School in 2006.

Early career
Jenrick qualified as a solicitor in 2008 and practised corporate law with Skadden Arps and Sullivan & Cromwell in London and Moscow. Immediately prior to being elected to Parliament in 2014 Jenrick was a director of Christie's, the auction house.

At the general election of 2010, Jenrick contested Newcastle-under-Lyme for the Conservative Party, but lost to the incumbent Paul Farrelly of the Labour Party by 1,582 votes, although he did achieve one of the largest swings to the Conservatives at 9.4%.

Political career
In November 2013, Jenrick was selected to contest the Parliamentary constituency of Newark, where the sitting member Patrick Mercer had resigned following a cash for lobbying scandal. At a by-election held on 5 June 2014, he retained the seat with a reduced majority of 7,403. Jenrick became the first Conservative candidate to win a by-election in Government since William Hague in Richmond in 1989 and achieved the strongest peacetime by-election result for the Conservative Party in Government for over 40 years.

During the campaign, Jenrick was criticised by UKIP's candidate, Roger Helmer, for owning several properties. Chris Grayling, the justice secretary, defended Jenrick, stating that being self-made and successful was nothing to be ashamed of.

In February 2016, Channel 4 News alleged overspending in Jenrick's 2014 by-election victory. Jenrick said he was confident his election expenses had been compiled in compliance with the law. Nottinghamshire Police took no action as too much time had passed since the alleged offence. In March 2017, the Electoral Commission released a report on their investigation into spending allegations at a number of elections. They concluded that the Conservative Party had contravened the spending rules three times (the 2014 Newark by-election being one of those times) and committed offences twice, and accordingly fined the party £70,000.

Shortly after his election in 2014, Jenrick was elected to the Health and Social Care Select Committee.

In February 2015, he was appointed Parliamentary Private Secretary (PPS) to the minister of state for employment at the Department for Work and Pensions, Esther McVey.

Jenrick was re-elected in the 2015 general election with a majority of 18,474, or 57% of the vote, the largest majority in the history of the constituency and the largest swing of any Conservative MP in that election.

In May 2015, he was appointed PPS to the lord chancellor and justice secretary, Michael Gove, and continued to fulfil the role under Gove's successor, Liz Truss from July 2016.

Jenrick was opposed to Brexit prior to the 2016 referendum. Jenrick has been Chair of the All Party Parliamentary Group (APPG) on International Trade & Investment and Vice Chairman of the Groups on China and France.

Following the 2017 general election, he was appointed PPS to the home secretary, Amber Rudd.

As Chairman of the APPG for the Prevention of Genocide and Crimes against Humanity, he along with Home Secretary Amber Rudd met Nadia Murad, an Iraqi Yazidi human rights activist who was in 2018 awarded the Nobel Peace Prize, to discuss how the UK could help with the reconstruction of Yazidi areas.

In July 2017, he was elected by fellow MPs to be their representative on the Board of the Conservative Party.

He was appointed Exchequer Secretary to the Treasury by Prime Minister Theresa May in her reshuffle of January 2018. He was the youngest minister in the Government.

In June 2019, he represented the Government at the Israel-Palestine peace initiative, led by Jared Kushner.

Secretary of State for Housing, Communities and Local Government (2019–2021)

After Boris Johnson became Prime Minister in the 2019 Conservative Party leadership election, Jenrick was appointed as Secretary of State for Housing, Communities and Local Government. He assumed office as Communities Secretary on 24 July 2019 and became the youngest member of Johnson's cabinet.

On 26 July 2019, he said, "I want tackling antisemitism and ensuring that the Jewish community feels protected and respected to be one of my priorities as Secretary of State". In September 2019, he said, "I will use my position as Secretary of State to write to all universities and local authorities to insist that they adopt the IHRA definition at the earliest opportunity... and use it when considering matters such as disciplinary procedures. Failure to act in this regard is unacceptable."

In January 2020, Jenrick spoke at the Conservative Friends of Israel Parliamentary reception and told the audience that he would "look forward to the day" when Britain's embassy in Israel will be "moved to Jerusalem", adding that "as Housing Secretary I don't like land-banking. I want us to build that embassy". The British Government had not indicated it would move its embassy from Tel Aviv to Jerusalem, as the US did in 2018. The Palestine Solidarity Campaign (PSC) called on Johnson to sack Jenrick, adding "no minister who openly advocates for law-breaking is fit to serve in Government".

His response to the national crisis with regard to housing safety following the Grenfell Tower fire was criticised as demonstrating a misunderstanding of the issue. His approach, which was said to include "naming and shaming", was seen by some as lacking robustness and ineffective. Jenrick was criticised as having failed to deliver on promises and take concrete action. There were over ten significant, life-threatening, fires after Grenfell, including the Bolton Cube fire. Thousands of affected residents continued to face financial burdens and their lives remained at risk. This stood in contrast to the more effective measures put in place by the Australian Government to keep its citizens safe.

In February 2020, in a survey of leaseholders from 117 housing developments by the Leasehold Knowledge Partnership, a charity that supports leaseholders, 90 per cent of respondents said the Government's response to the "cladding crisis" had been "no help at all". In October 2020, it was estimated that 700,000 people were still trapped in flats wrapped in flammable materials, and 3.6 million had fire-related defects and faced a wait of 10 years before they could sell their flat or get a new mortgage.

In April 2020, The Sunday Times reported Jenrick had charged taxpayers more than £100,000 for "a third home" in his constituency of Newark, that he appeared to use only rarely.

In November 2020, the Public Accounts Committee concluded that Jenrick's constituency had been awarded funding by his department as part of a process that was opaque and not impartial.

On 15 September 2021, it was announced that Jenrick had been dismissed as Communities Secretary after Boris Johnson had reshuffled his cabinet, and had been succeeded by Chancellor of the Duchy of Lancaster Michael Gove.

COVID-19 pandemic
In April 2020, after Jenrick repeatedly urged the public at televised press briefings to stay at home during the lockdown to curb the spread of coronavirus, the Daily Mail claimed on 10 April that he had twice flouted Government restrictions after they were announced: first by travelling  from London to a second home in Herefordshire, Eye Manor, where he was now living with his family, and then by travelling  to see his parents near Shrewsbury in Shropshire. He was accused by Anna Soubry of "selfish arrogance". Jenrick defended the former trip, reiterating he was travelling to his family home, where his family were before any restrictions on travel were announced. He also defended the latter trip, stating his parents had asked him to deliver some essentials, including medicines, and he had not entered the house. This position was supported by the emeritus director of Public Health England.

Previously, on 22 March 2020, he had written an article for The Mail on Sunday arguing that rather than relatives travelling, local communities should help out. Jenrick's primary residence was his townhouse in Central London, where his wife worked and his three children attended school. Senior MPs called for Jenrick to consider his position, given his high-profile role in Downing Street's campaign to keep the British public inside during the outbreak, including the ban on travelling to second homes.

Planning issues
In June 2020, Jenrick faced questions over his links to a Conservative donor after it emerged that he met an Israeli businessman, Idan Ofer, with an interest in the future of a multibillion-pound project that Jenrick, then exchequer secretary to the Treasury, was overseeing. Ofer stated that the £10,000 donation via his Quantum Pacific business was made at the behest of Conservative Friends of Israel, of which Jenrick was a member.  Jenrick later said that Ofer was a family friend.

The same month, it was reported that Conservative councillors approved a planning application for an extension to Jenrick's townhouse despite officials objecting to the scheme three times over its damaging impact in a conservation area.

In March 2019, Jenrick’s predecessor, James Brokenshire, had decided that a planning application for a new 17-storey tower in Notting Hill which had been rejected three times by the Royal Borough of Kensington and Chelsea should be referred to him instead of being dealt with by the Greater London Authority. In June 2020, on the advice of a planning inspector, Jenrick granted permission for the tower. The decision was described by Kensington and Chelsea's lead councillor for planning as a "major blow to local residents", as the development would "cause harm to our unique borough and, in particular, nearby listed buildings and conservation areas". In his decision letter, Jenrick had agreed that the proposals would damage the significance of the area's local heritage, but he found that the effect on the townscape would be "neutral-to-beneficial" and that "the provision of housing attracts very significant weight". 

In July 2020 the president of the Royal Institute of British Architects, Alan Jones, condemned Jenrick's proposals to extend Permitted Development Rights. In an open letter, he stated that "The extension of this policy is truly disgraceful. There is no evidence that the planning system is to blame for the shortage of housing, and plenty to suggest that leaving local communities powerless in the face of developers seeking short-term returns will lead to poor results." Jones also argued that the proposals contradicted the Government's own advisors "who had concluded that permitted development had 'permissioned future slums' – allowing sub-standard homes to be built with little to no natural light and smaller than budget hotel rooms." Jones instead recommended that changes should be made to taxation and funding systems to incentivise investment in sustainable buildings, whilst also improving minimum space standards. He confirmed he would be writing to Jenrick as a matter of urgency and the letter would also be signed by CIOB, RICS and RTPI.

In January 2021 Jenrick declined South Lakeland MP Tim Farron's request to call in for review plans for Whitehaven coal mine, the first new deep coal mine in the UK in 30 years, after Cumbria County Council approved the plan. Farron described the coal mine as a "complete disaster for our children's future" and that "it's utter and rank hypocrisy for this Conservative Government to claim one minute that they care about protecting our environment, and in the next give the green light to a deep coal mine". West Cumbria Mining said it would create 500 jobs and pay into a community fund for 10 years.

Unlawful approval of Westferry housing development

On 14 January 2020, Jenrick approved a £1 billion luxury housing development of 1,500 homes on Westferry Road, Isle of Dogs, proposed by Richard Desmond, a Conservative Party donor and owner of Northern & Shell. A Government planning inspector had advised against permitting the scheme, as it would not deliver enough affordable housing and as the height of the tower would be detrimental to the character of the area. When Jenrick approved the scheme on 14 January, he knew that an approval by that date would enable Desmond to avoid having to pay a council-imposed infrastructure levy of between £30 and £50 million, which could have been used for funding schools and health clinics. Tower Hamlets London Borough Council then pursued a judicial review against Jenrick’s decision in the High Court, arguing that it had shown bias towards Desmond. It was also reported that Jenrick had helped Desmond to save an additional £106m by allowing affordable housing at 21%, instead of enforcing the local and London-wide planning policy requirement of 35%. This could have resulted in a total discount (and subsequent loss of revenue to the Exchequer) of approximately £150 million.

In May 2020, Jenrick did not contest the judicial review, conceding that his sign-off of the scheme was "unlawful by reason of apparent bias". He also confirmed that his approval had deliberately been issued before the new CIL policy could be adopted. This meant that Jenrick was able to avoid disclosing correspondence relating to the application in open court. His planning permission was quashed by the High Court, which ordered that the matter was to be decided by a different minister.

Jenrick maintained that although the decision had been "unlawful by reason of apparent bias", there had been no "actual bias". Desmond, whose company had donated to the Conservative Party in 2017, made a further personal donation to the party shortly after the approval was given. Andrew Wood, the leader of the Conservative group on Tower Hamlets Council, resigned because of his concerns over the property deal. The planning decision will now be re-determined by a different Government minister. In conceding the move did show "apparent bias", Jenrick effectively blocked the judicial review, which originally prevented documents between his department and the developer from being made public. Mayor of Tower Hamlets John Biggs said: "We may never know what emails and memos the secretary of state received before making his decision and what influence they had, but his reluctance to disclose them speaks volumes".

In June 2020 Desmond told The Sunday Times he had lobbied Jenrick at a Conservative Party fundraising dinner held at the Savoy in November. He said he had showed Jenrick "three or four minutes" of a promotional video for the Westferry Printworks development on his mobile phone, adding "he got the gist". The interview was followed by a Labour Party opposition day motion debate in the House of Commons on 24 June, which forced Jenrick into releasing all "relevant" documents surrounding his dealings with Desmond, including private text messages between him and the developer that show discussion of the then live planning application beginning the night of the fundraising dinner. One of the emails revealed that Ministry of Housing, Communities and Local Government (MHCLG) officials were being pressured by Jenrick to work out how to overrule the Government's own planning inspector so he could approve the plans before any increase in the Tower Hamlets council community infrastructure levy (CIL), which Desmond would have had to pay. That Jenrick did not disclose to his department his potential conflict of interest until a month after his dinner raised concern. The release of the documents led to calls for Jenrick's resignation for his use of a public office for political favours.

In August 2020, members of Grenfell United refused an invitation to have a meeting with Jenrick due to the slow progress of enforcing the findings of the first phase of the Grenfell Tower Inquiry, a lack of progress on reforming social housing and his controversy with Desmond. In a letter, the group told him "Your perceived focus on the interests of property developers over the needs of an impoverished local community has soured our opinion of you. It tells us you have learned nothing from your previous interactions and conversations with Grenfell United committee members who lost so much on the night of the fire. Bereaved families and survivors sat with you and opened their hearts, and your actions have thrown this trust back in our faces."

Holocaust memorial
In June 2020, Jenrick was described  by Baroness Deech as breaching "the guidance on planning propriety" over his management of a planning application to build a national Holocaust memorial, which she described as controversial. The MHCLG, Jenrick's department, took control of the approval process from Westminster Council days after he met the project's main backers, including Gerald Ronson.

The planning application was called in by Jenrick in November 2019; this was hours before Parliament was dissolved, and three months before Westminster Council unanimously rejected the scheme. The application was submitted in 2018 by the UK Holocaust Memorial Foundation, an organisation sponsored by the MHCLG.

In July 2020, Jenrick faced High Court action brought by the London Parks & Gardens Trust over his handling of the Holocaust memorial planning application and decision to allow his junior colleague, housing minister Christopher Pincher, to determine the fate of the application. Jenrick's decision stripped Westminster City Council of its power to rule on the £102 million project – which was to be built in Victoria Tower Gardens – a grade II listed park near the Palace of Westminster, which the trust said was "the last piece of publicly accessible land in central London".

Ministerial career (2022–present) 
Following the election of Liz Truss as Prime Minister, Jenrick was appointed Minister of State for Health.

In October 2022, Jenrick was appointed Minister of State for Immigration, a cabinet attending role, by Prime Minister Rishi Sunak. That same month, Jenrick agreed to visit the Home Office facility in Manston, Kent after the Independent Inspector of Borders David Neal said to MPs the situation at the centre was "wretched".

Political views
Jenrick is a member of the Parliamentary Conservative Friends of Israel group. In July 2019 he spoke of his visit to Auschwitz concentration camp; "It had a huge impact on me and in particular because my wife is the daughter of Holocaust survivors from modern day Poland and Ukraine." Jenrick has said his connection to the Jewish community forms "a very important and integral part of my life".

Jenrick supports designating Albania as a safe country for the purposes of asylum claims after an increase in Albanian nationals crossing the English channel, describing the country as demonstrably safe but he also described current levels of migration into the United Kingdom as unsustainable with illegal migration likely to become an issue for many years to come.

Personal life
Jenrick is married to Michal Berkner. She is nine years older than Jenrick and is the child of Holocaust survivors. She is an Israeli-born and US educated corporate lawyer who practises mainly in London. The couple have three daughters, whom they are bringing up in the Jewish faith.

He owns two £2m homes in London, one of which is a £2.5m townhouse less than a mile from the Houses of Parliament. He also owns Eye Manor, a Grade I listed building in Herefordshire which he purchased for £1.1 million in 2009. He rents a £2,000-a-month property in his Newark constituency, which is paid for by the MPs' second homes allowance.

References

External links

|-

1982 births
Living people
People from Newark-on-Trent
People educated at Wolverhampton Grammar School
Alumni of St John's College, Cambridge
Christie's people
Conservative Party (UK) MPs for English constituencies
English lawyers
English businesspeople
Skadden, Arps, Slate, Meagher & Flom people
University of Pennsylvania fellows
UK MPs 2010–2015
UK MPs 2015–2017
UK MPs 2017–2019
UK MPs 2019–present
Sullivan & Cromwell people
Members of the Privy Council of the United Kingdom